Elandskloof Dam is a gravity type dam located on the Elandskloof River, near Villiersdorp, Western Cape, South Africa. It was established in 1976. The primary purpose of the dam is for irrigation and domestic water supply. Its hazard potential has been ranked high (3).

This dam flows into the Theewaterskloof Dam, which is a major supplier of household water to the city of Cape Town.

See also
List of reservoirs and dams in South Africa
List of rivers of South Africa

References 

 List of South African Dams from the Department of Water Affairs

Dams in South Africa
Dams completed in 1976